Heliades lindae is a species of moth of the family Pyralidae that is endemic to  Arizona.

The forewings are brownish red with white dentate antemedial and postmedial lines. The hindwings are light greyish brown.

References

Moths described in 2012
Endemic fauna of Arizona
Chrysauginae